Lucas Rocrou (born 27 March 2003) is a French professional footballer who plays as a right winger for  club Bordeaux.

Club career 
Originally from the French overseas department of Réunion, Rocrou began playing football at AS Marsouins. In 2018, he joined the youth academy of Bordeaux. His first appearances with the club's reserve side in the Championnat National 3 came in the 2021–22 season.

On 6 August 2022, Rocrou made his professional debut for Bordeaux, coming on as a late-match substitute in a 3–0 Ligue 2 victory away to Rodez. He would go on to make two further substitute appearances in the first half of the season. On 3 January 2023, it was announced that Rocrou had signed his first professional contract with Bordeaux, a deal until the summer of 2024, and that he had been loaned out to Championnat National club Bourg-en-Bresse for the remainder of the season. However, during his second training session with his new club, he injured himself on a shot, resulting in approximately eight weeks on the sidelines. Bourg-en-Bresse decided not to wait for Rocrou's injury to heal and subsequently terminated the loan deal, precisely one week after he had joined the club.

International career 
Rocrou represented France at under-17 level, and made five appearances for the side in 2019.

Career statistics

References 

2003 births
Living people
French footballers
People from Saint-Pierre, Réunion
Footballers from Réunion
French people of Réunionnais descent
Black French sportspeople
Association football wingers
AS Marsouins players
FC Girondins de Bordeaux players
Championnat National 3 players
Ligue 2 players
France youth international footballers